HMS Hirondelle was the French privateer Hirondelle that  captured in 1804. The Royal Navy took Hirondelle into service under her existing name. She captured a number of vessels in the Mediterranean and participated in one notable action against a Turkish vessel. She was wrecked in 1808 with the loss of almost her entire crew.

Capture
Hirondelle was a privateer from Marseille, originally with 180 men and 14 guns.

In the evening of 27th Hirondelle captured, after an action, the Government of Malta brig King George off Cape Passero.

The next morning , which had been sent in search of Hirondelle, was eight leagues from Cape Passero when she sighted Hirondelle capturing two brigs. At Bitterns approach, the three vessels separated. Hirondelle apparently set off after a sloop she had sighted.

Captain Robert Corbet of Bittern detached two boats, one for each of the brigs, and set off in pursuit of Hirondelle. After a chase of 36 hours, in perfect calm, Bittern was able to capture Hirondelle. To catch her, Corbett had converted the smaller spars he carried to sweeps (large oars). His crew rowed all 36 hours without a break, not even for meals, and covered some 60 miles without the assistance of any wind.

During the last six hours of the chase, the two had exchanged fire from their bow and stern chasers. Hirondelles fire, aimed primarily at Bitterns mast and except for one hole between wind and water, which was easily stopped, did little damage. One shot from Bittern caused a hole in Hirondelle that had her fast filling with water, forcing her to strike. Bitterns crew was able to stop this hole too.

Corbet described Hirondelle as a "very fine cutter", fitted out at Cette and just launched. Her hull had copper sheathing, and she was armed with fourteen 12-pounder guns. She had a complement of 80 crew, many of whom were away on prizes.

From Hirondelle Corbet found out about the capture of King George. He dispatched his launch, whose crew then rowed 15 leagues to try to recapture King George before she reached Syracuse. However, they were unable to catch up in time.

When Bitterns boats recaptured the two brigs, they turned out to be Mentor, of London, and Catherine, of Liverpool. They had been sailing with valuable cargoes from Messina to Malta to join a convoy. Lloyd's List reported that Bittern had recaptured Mentor and Catherine, and their captor.

Career
On 19 June 1804, Admiral Lord Nelson ordered the purchase of Hirondelle at Malta and her assignment to Malta to serve Admiral Sir Alexander Ball, Civil Commissioner of Malta.

Nelson appointed "Lieutenant Skinner" on 12 August to command Hirondelle.

 captured the French privateer Andromeda, of four guns and 43
men on 10 December 1805, cutting her out of the port of Reggio. She shared the prize money for the capture with Hirondelle.

By 1807, Hirondelle was under the command of Lieutenant George Augustus Elliot Skinner.

On 19 February 1807,  captured the Turkish vessels San Giovanni Pidomias and Codro Mariolo. That same day Glatton and Hirondelle captured San Michelle.

Four days later, Hirondelle captured the vessel Madonna, with Glatton sharing by agreement. On 26 February Hirondelle captured San Nicollo, and Glatton again shared by agreement.

On 1 March, boats from Glatton cut out a former French corvette in Turkish service from the port of Sigri on the island of Mitylene. The vessel was pierced for 18 guns but only 10 were mounted. The British boarding party lost five officers and men killed and nine men wounded. Hirondelle provided support.

The next day Glatton and Hirondelle captured three more Turkish vessels, names unknown but with masters Statio, Constantine, and Papeli. Prize money for these vessels, and San Michelle, was paid in October 1816.

On 4 March Glatton and Hirondelle captured another Turkish vessel.

A prize money announcement had Hirondelle, under the command of Lieutenant John Skinner, capturing Aristides on 21 September 1807.

Fate
On 23 February 1808 Hirondelle was under the command of Lieutenant Joseph Kidd and transporting despatches from Malta to Tunis. Suddenly breakers were sighted ahead and though the crew threw over anchors, it was too late and she grounded. Waves swamped a boat carrying some of the crew that were leaving the ship. The brig then capsized. In all, next morning there were only four survivors, with Kidd not being among them. The survivors walked to a nearby village. The court martial found that Hirondelle had probably steered a wrong course that led her into Cape Bon.

Notes, citations, and references
Notes

Citations

References

 
 

Nicholas, Sir Nicholas Harris (1846) The Dispatches and Letters of Vice Admiral Lord Viscount Nelson: With Notes, Volume 6. (H. Colburn).
O’Byrne, William R. (1849) A naval biographical dictionary: comprising the life and services of every living officer in Her Majesty's navy, from the rank of admiral of the fleet to that of lieutenant, inclusive. (London: J. Murray), vol. 1.

External links
 

1804 ships
Privateer ships of France
Captured ships
Cutters of the Royal Navy
Brigs of the Royal Navy
Maritime incidents in 1808
Shipwrecks in the Mediterranean Sea
Shipwrecks of Africa